The Biodiversity Party was an Estonian green political party, which was founded in September 2018 and one of its leaders was the former Estonian Free Party chief Artur Talvik. They described themselves as post-ideological and their aim was to develop Estonia into a decentralized smart eco-digital country.

On 20 August 2020, the party merged with the Estonian Free Party to form the Estonian Party for the Future.

Electoral results

Parliamentary elections

European Parliament elections

References 

Centrist parties in Estonia
Political parties in Estonia
Political parties established in 2018
2018 establishments in Estonia
Green parties in Europe
2020 disestablishments in Estonia
Political parties disestablished in 2020